This is a list of writings published by the Hungarian historian Sándor Csernus. He has written and published his works in Hungarian, English, German, and French.

Sándor Csernus writings

2016
1. Csernus, Sándor: From the Arsenal of Sigismund’s Diplomacy: Universalism versus Sovereignty In: Bárány Attila Pál (szerk.) Egyéb szerzőség: Bacsa Balázs Antal (sajtó alá rend.); Das Konzil von Konstanz und Ungarn. 275 p. Konferencia helye, ideje: Debrecen, Magyarország, 2014.11.05-2014.11.07. Debrecen: MTA, 2016. pp. 9–32. (Memoria Hungariae; 1.)
2. Csernus, Sándor: V. László franciaországi követségének forrásaihoz: Tours, 1457. december In: Tóth Ferenc, Zágorhidi Czigány Balázs (szerk.) Via Sancti Martini: Szent Márton útjai térben és időben. 375 p. Budapest: MTA BTK Történettudományi Intézet, 2016. pp. 165–190.
3. Csernus, Sándor: Myth, Propaganda and Popular Etymology: János Hunyadi – "White" or "Vlach" Knight? CHRONICA: ANNUAL OF THE INSTITUTE OF HISTORY UNIVERSITY OF SZEGED 12: pp. 125–147. (2016)
4. Csernus, Sándor: Jean de Joinville történetének kéziratai, első kiadásai és a könyvnyomtatók felelőssége In: Nyerges Judit, Verók Attila, Zvara Edina (szerk.): MONOKgraphia: Tanulmányok Monok István 60. születésnapjára. 847 p. Budapest: Kossuth Kiadó, 2016. pp. 132–137.

2015
5. Csernus, Sándor: Egyéb szerzőség: Szász Géza (ford.); Tibor Wittman, rappel d’une vie riche et douloureusement courte ÖT KONTINENS: AZ ÚJ- ÉS JELENKORI EGYETEMES TÖRTÉNETI TANSZÉK TUDOMÁNYOS KÖZLEMÉNYEI 2013:(2) pp. 21–27. (2015)
6. Csernus, Sándor: Tipikus és kivételes: A Joinville-ek: egy champagne-i bárói család kiemelkedése In: Jean de Joinville Egyéb szerzőség: Csernus Sándor, Cs Tóth Annamária (ford.); Csernus Sándor (forrás kiad.); Szent Lajos élete és bölcs mondásai. 434 p. Budapest: Balassi Kiadó, 2015. pp. 275–303. (A középkori francia történeti irodalom remekei; 2.)
7. Csernus, Sándor: A "super homo" és Joinville Szent Lajosa In: Jean de Joinville Egyéb szerzőség: Csernus Sándor, Cs Tóth Annamária (ford.); Csernus Sándor (forrás kiad.); Szent Lajos élete és bölcs mondásai. 434 p. Budapest: Balassi Kiadó, 2015. pp. 304–331. (A középkori francia történeti irodalom remekei; 2.)
8. Csernus, Sándor: Kronológia Joinville művének tanulmányozásához In: Jean de Joinville Egyéb szerzőség: Csernus Sándor, Cs Tóth Annamária (ford.); Csernus Sándor (forrás kiad.); Szent Lajos élete és bölcs mondásai. 434 p. Budapest: Balassi Kiadó, 2015. pp. 353–360. (A középkori francia történeti irodalom remekei; 2.)
9. Csernus, Sándor: Országok, dinasztiák és uralkodók In: Jean de Joinville Egyéb szerzőség: Csernus Sándor, Cs Tóth Annamária (ford.); Csernus Sándor (forrás kiad.); Szent Lajos élete és bölcs mondásai. 434 p. Budapest: Balassi Kiadó, 2015. pp. 361–386. (A középkori francia történeti irodalom remekei; 2.)
10. Csernus, Sándor: A keresztes háborúk résztvevõi: Bárók és lovagrendek In: Jean de Joinville Egyéb szerzőség: Csernus Sándor, Cs Tóth Annamária (ford.); Csernus Sándor (forrás kiad.); Szent Lajos élete és bölcs mondásai. 434 p. Budapest: Balassi Kiadó, 2015. pp. 387–395. (A középkori francia történeti irodalom remekei; 2.)
11. Csernus, Sándor: Válogatott bibliográfia In: Jean de Joinville Egyéb szerzőség: Csernus Sándor, Cs Tóth Annamária (ford.); Csernus Sándor (forrás kiad.); Szent Lajos élete és bölcs mondásai. 434 p. Budapest: Balassi Kiadó, 2015. pp. 396–409. (A középkori francia történeti irodalom remekei; 2.)
12. Csernus, Sándor: Francia hadifoglyok hétköznapjai Magyarországon: 1940-1945 In: Gyarmati György, Pihurik Judit (szerk.): Háborús hétköznapok hadszíntéren, hátországban 1939-1945. 328 p. Konferencia helye, ideje: Szeged, Magyarország, 2013.10.03-2013.10.04. Budapest; Pécs: Kronosz Kiadó; Magyar Történelmi Társulat; Állambiztonsági Szolgálatok Történeti Levéltára, 2015. pp. 121–141.
13. Jacques Le Goff Egyéb szerzőség: Csernus Sándor (ford.): Szent Lajos: Következtetések In: Jean de Joinville Egyéb szerzőség: Csernus Sándor, Cs Tóth Annamária (ford.); Csernus Sándor (forrás kiad.); Szent Lajos élete és bölcs mondásai. 434 p. Budapest: Balassi Kiadó, 2015. pp. 265–274. (A középkori francia történeti irodalom remekei; 2.)
14. Jean de Joinville Egyéb szerzőség: Csernus Sándor, Cs Tóth Annamária (ford.); Csernus Sándor (forráskiad.); Szent Lajos élete és bölcs mondásai, Budapest: Balassi Kiadó, 2015. 434 p. (A középkori francia történeti irodalom remekei; 2.)

2013
15. Csernus, Sándor: Jehan de Wavrin krónikája: angol történelem, francia történetírás és keresztes hadjárat: Burgundiak az Al-Dunán (1444-1445) In: Györkös Attila, Kiss Gergely (szerk.): Francia-magyar kapcsolatok a középkorban. 350 p. Debrecen: Debreceni Egyetemi Kiadó, 2013. p. 127. (Speculum Historiae Debreceniense; 13.)
16. Csernus, Sándor: A kelet vonzásában: Konstantinápoly meghódítása és a francia nyelvű történetírás születése In: Robert de Clari Egyéb szerzőség: Csernus Sándor, Cs Tóth Annamária (ford.); Konstantinápoly hódoltatása. 264 p. Budapest: Balassi Kiadó, 2013. pp. 177–194. (A középkori francia történeti irodalom remekei; 1.)
17. Csernus, Sándor: Kronológia Robert de Clari krónikájának tanulmányozásához In: Robert de Clari Egyéb szerzőség: Csernus Sándor, Cs Tóth Annamária (ford.); Konstantinápoly hódoltatása. 264 p. Budapest: Balassi Kiadó, 2013. pp. 195–202. (A középkori francia történeti irodalom remekei; 1.)
18. Csernus, Sándor: Dinasztiák és uralkodók 1100-1300 In: Robert de Clari Egyéb szerzőség: Csernus Sándor, Cs Tóth Annamária (ford.); Konstantinápoly hódoltatása. 264 p. Budapest: Balassi Kiadó, 2013. pp. 203–218. (A középkori francia történeti irodalom remekei; 1.)
19. Csernus, Sándor: Válogatott bibliográfia In: Robert de Clari Egyéb szerzőség: Csernus Sándor, Cs Tóth Annamária (ford.); Konstantinápoly hódoltatása. 264 p. Budapest: Balassi Kiadó, 2013. pp. 219–226. (A középkori francia történeti irodalom remekei; 1.)
20. Robert de Clari: Egyéb szerzőség: Csernus Sándor, Cs Tóth Annamária (ford.); Konstantinápoly hódoltatása Budapest: Balassi Kiadó, 2013. 264 p. (A középkori francia történeti irodalom remekei; 1.)
21. Cs. Tóth Annamária, Csernus Sándor: Előszó a magyar kiadáshoz In: Robert de Clari Egyéb szerzőség: Csernus Sándor, Cs. Tóth Annamária (ford.); Konstantinápoly hódoltatása. 264 p. Budapest: Balassi Kiadó, 2013. pp. 9–13. (A középkori francia történeti irodalom remekei; 1.)

2011
22. Csernus, Sándor: Mítosz, propaganda és népi etimológia: Hunyadi János: "Fehér" vagy "Vlach" lovag? ACTA HISTORICA (SZEGED) 128: pp. 3–33. (2011).

2010
23. Csernus, S, Tonnerre N-Y: Préface In: Bérenger J La Hongrie des Habsbourg: De 1526 à 1790. 401 p. Rennes: Presses Universitaires de Rennes, 2010. pp. I-V. (Histoire (Rennes)) Tom.1..
24. Csernus, Sándor, Forgács Tamás: Új típusú egységes tanárképzés vagy a bolognai tanári mesterképzés korrekciós modellje? Hogyan tovább a tanárképzésben?: Helyzetelemzési kísérlet és megvalósítási javaslatok PEDAGÓGUSKÉPZÉS: PEDAGÓGUSKÉPZŐK ÉS -TOVÁBBKÉPZŐK FOLYÓIRATA 8:(1) pp. 109–115. (2010)
25. Csernus, Sándor: Une idéologie à l’épreuve de la modernité: L’idée de la croisade en Hongrie au tournant des XVe-XVIe siècles In: de Cevins Marie-Madeleine (szerk.): L’Europe centrale au seuil de la modérnité: Mutations sociales, religieuses et culturelles. Autriche, Bohême, Hongrie et Pologne, fin du XVe–milieu du XVIe siècle. Konferencia helye, ideje: Fontevraud, Franciaország, 2009.05.15-2009.05.16. Rennes: Presses Universitaires de Rennes, 2010. pp. 57–74.

2009
26. Csernus, Sándor: Hungarologie. Les études hongroises dans le monde: Principes, structures, objectifs et perspectives In: Szende T (szerk.): Politiques linguistiques, apprentissage des langues et francophonie en Europe centrale et orientale: Les défis de la diversité. Paris: Éditions des archives contemporaines, 2009. p. &.
27. Csernus, Sándor: La Hongrie de Mathias Corvin: Ruptures et continuité dans l’histoire hongroise du 15e siècle In: Jean-François Maillard, István Monok, Donatella Nebbiai (szerk.): Matthias Corvin, les bibliothèques princières et la genèse de l’état moderne. 340 p. Konferencia helye, ideje: Párizs, Franciaország, 2007.11.15-2007.11.17. Budapest: Országos Széchényi Könyvtár (OSZK), 2009. pp. 13–24. (Supplementum Corvinianum; 2.)
28. Csernus, Sándor: In memoriam Radnóti Miklós In: Olasz Sándor, Zelena András (szerk.): “Mert annyit érek én, amennyit ér a szó”: Szegedi Radnóti-konferenciák. 232 p. Szeged: SZTE BTK, 2009. pp. 4–9.

2008
29. Csernus, Sándor: 1456: La victoire de Nándorfehérvár et son influence sur le développement de la conscience nationale des Hongrois In: Judit Maár, Patrick Renaud (szerk.): Temps, Espaces, Langages - la Hongrie a la croisée des disciplines.: Actes du colloque des 7-8-9 décembre 2006. Cahiers d'Études Hongroises n/14. Konferencia helye, ideje: Paris, Franciaország, 2006.12.07-2006.12.09. Paris: L'Harmattan Kiadó, 2008. p. 
30. Csernus, Sándor: Lancelot király a Kereszténység „pajzsa” és „védfala”: A kortárs francia történetírás V. László portréjához In: Berta T, Csikós Zs, Fischer F, Szilágyi Á, Szilágyi I (szerk.) Az identitás régi és új koordinátái: Tanulmányok Anderle Ádám 65. születésnapjára. 322 p. Szeged; Budapest: Palatinus Kiadó, 2008. pp. 161–173.

2007
31. Csernus, S, Poly J-P: Előszó In: Kálnoky Natália, Csernus Sándor (szerk.): A nemes székely nemzet konstitúciói és privilégiumai: Egy szokásrendszer meggyökerezése és fennmaradása a középkori Erdélyben. 207 p. Csíkszereda: Pallas-Akadémia Könyvkiadó, 2007. pp. 9–13.
32. Csernus, Sándor: A Balassi Intézet és az ország-kép: A kultúra felértékelődése a nemzetközi kapcsolatokban In: Külföldi magyar kulturális intézetek igazgatóinak találkozója. Konferencia helye, ideje: Budapest, Magyarország, 2007.07.03-2007.07.04. Balassi Bálint Magyar Kulturális Intézet; OM, p. 12.
33. Kálnoky, Natália & Csernus, Sándor (szerk.): A nemes székely nemzet konstitúciói és privilégiumai: Egy szokásrendszer meggyökerezése és fennmaradása a középkori Erdélyben Csíkszereda: Pallas-Akadémia Könyvkiadó, 2007. 207 p.

2006
34. Csernus, Sándor: Luxemburgi Zsigmond emléke a francia forrásokban In: Takács Imre (szerk.): Sigismundus rex et imperator : művészet és kultúra Luxemburgi Zsigmond korában, 1387-1437: kiállítási katalógus : Budapest, Szépművészeti Múzeum, 2006. március 18 - június 18., Luxemburg, Musée national d'histoire et d'art, 2006. július 13 - október 15. 733 p. Mainz: Philipp von Zabern, 2006. pp. 487–494.
35. Csernus, Sándor: Le souvenir de Sigismond dans les sources francaises In: Takács Imre (szerk.) Sigismundus rex et imperator : művészet és kultúra Luxemburgi Zsigmond korában, 1387-1437: kiállítási katalógus : Budapest, Szépművészeti Múzeum, 2006. március 18 - június 18., Luxemburg, Musée national d'histoire et d'art, 2006. július 13 - október 15. 733 p. Mainz: Philipp von Zabern, 2006. p. &.
36. Csernus, Sándor: Sigismundus von Luxemburg und die franzözische Geschichtssreibung In: Takács Imre (szerk.): Sigismundus rex et imperator : művészet és kultúra Luxemburgi Zsigmond korában, 1387-1437: kiállítási katalógus : Budapest, Szépművészeti Múzeum, 2006. március 18 - június 18., Luxemburg, Musée national d'histoire et d'art, 2006. július 13 - október 15. 733 p. Mainz: Philipp von Zabern, 2006. p. &.
37. Csernus, Sándor: Magyarságtudomány és nemzetközi kapcsolatok In: Vendégtanári és Lektori konferencia. Konferencia helye, ideje: Budapest, Magyarország, 2006.08.28 Budapest: Balassi Bálint Magyar Kulturális Intézet, p. 14.

2005
38. Csernus, Sándor: Átmeneti fellendülés, vagy esély az áttörésre? A magyar kultúra pozíciói és a magyar irodalom Franciaországban: On the changing Hungarian-French cultural relations MIKES INTERNATIONAL - HUNGARIAN PERIODICAL FOR ART LITERATURE AND SCIENCE 5:(3) pp. 25–32. (2005)
39. Csernus, Sándor: La Hongrie et l’Europe: L’apport culturel des nouveaux États membres de l’Union Européenne et spécialement celui de la Hongrie In: Marès A (szerk.) La culture et l'Europe. Du rêve européen aux réalités: Actes du colloque international, Fondation Singer-Polignac, 31 mars 2005. 191 p. Konferencia helye, ideje: Paris, Franciaország, 2005.03.31 Paris: Institut d'études slaves (IES), 2005. pp. 27–55. (Travaux publiés par l'Institut d'études slaves; 48.)
40. Csernus, Sándor: Átmeneti fellenülés vagy esély az áttörésre ?: A magyar kultúra pozíciói és a magyar irodalom Franciaországban In: Hírünk a világban: Hollandiai Mikes Kelemen Kör, Mikes International 45. Tanulmányi Napok. Konferencia helye, ideje: Elspeet, Hollandia, 2004.09.09-2004.09.12. Hága: Stichting Mikes International, pp. 1–16.
41. Csernus, Sándor: A magyar kortárs képzőművészet és iparművészet bemutatása a Párizsi Magyar Intézetben In: Simonffy Márta (szerk.): Helyzet - nemzetközi konferencia: A magyar művészet helyzete az európai csatlakozás idején. 263 p. Konferencia helye, ideje: Budapest, Magyarország, 2005.05.30-2005.05.31. Budapest: Magyar Képzőművészek és Iparművészek Szövetsége, 2005. pp. 203–212.
42. Csernus, Sándor: Les Anjou dans les livres scolaires hongrois des 19e et 20e siècles AKADEMOS 5:(sp.) p. &. (2005)
43. Csernus, Sándor (szakértő): Kapcsoskönyv 1-12 rész: Fejezetek a magyar-francia kapcsolatok történetéből; Dokumentum sorozat Prod. Római Róbert; rendező: Szakály István; Vikol Katalin; operatőr: Stenszky Gyula, MTV; fejezetenként 40’ perc, Video + DVD, 1993-2005 (2005)

2004
44. Csernus, S, Poly J-P: Préface In: Kálnoky N. Les constitutions et priviléges de la noble nation sicule: Acculturation et maintien d'un systéme coutumier dans la Transylvanie médiévale. Budapest; Paris; Szeged: Institut Hongrois de Paris; Société pour l' Encyclopédie de l' Histoire de l' Église en Hongrie, 2004. pp. 9–14. (Publications de l'Institut Hongrois de Paris. Dissertationes; 2.)
45. Csernus, Sándor: Évolution spécifique de la culture hongroise et ses relations avec l’espace francophone TRANSITIONS & SOCIÉTÉS 6: pp. 91–101. (2004)

2003
46. Csernus, Sándor: A Magyar Könyv Franciaországban In: Bernáth Árpád, Bombitz Attila (szerk.): Magyar irodalmi jelenlét idegen kontextusban. Szeged: Grimm Könyvkiadó, 2003. pp. 203–215.

2002
47. Csernus, Sándor: Nouvelles publications de l’Institut Hongrois In: Toulouze Henri, Hanus Erzsébet La bibliographie de la Hongrie en langue francaise. 517 p. Paris; Budapest: Párizsi Magyar Intézet; Országos Széchényi Könyvtár, 2002. p. 5. (Documenta Hungarorum in Gallia; 1.)
48. Csernus, Sándor: La Hongrie, rempart de la Chrétienté: Naissance et épanouissement de l’idée d’une mission collective In: Delsol C, Masłowski M, Nowicki J (szerk.) Mythes et symboles politiques en Europe centrale. Paris: Presses Universitaires de France (PUF), 2002. pp. 107–123. (Politique d'aujourd'hui)

2001
49. Csernus, Sándor: La Hongrie des Anjou: Le bilan d’une grande puissance médiévale In: Guy Le Goff, Francesco Aceto (szerk.): L'Europe des Anjou: Aventure des princes angevins du XIIIe au XVe siécle. Paris: Somogy éditions d'art, 2001. pp. 154–168
50. Csernus, Sándor: Kálmán Benda et l’avenir fondé sur le passé In: Péter Sahin-Tóth (szerk.): Rencontres intellectuelles franco-hongroises: regards croisés sur l'histoire et la littérature : actes des tables rondes franco-hongroises (1997 - 1998) organisées par le Service culturel, scientifique et de coopération de l'Ambassade de France en Hongrie, l'Institut Français en Hongrie et le Collegium Budapest. Budapest: Collegium Budapest Institute for Advanced Study, 2001. pp. 139–152. (Workshop series / Collegium Budapest; 10.)

2000
51. Csernus, S, Tonnerre N-Y: Préface In: Kristó GY Histoire de la Hongrie médievale. I. Le temps des Arpads. 224 p. Rennes: Presses Universitaires de Rennes, 2000. pp. 7–12.
52. Csernus, Sándor: La Hongrie et les Hongrois dans la littérature chevaleresque française In: Coulet N (szerk.): La noblesse dans les territoires angevins à la fin du Moyen Age: actes du colloque international : Angers-Saumur, 3-4 juin 1998. 845 p. Konferencia helye, ideje:, Franciaország, 1998.06.03-1998.06.06. Róma: École Francaise de Rome, 2000. pp. 717–735. (Collection de l'École Francaise de Rome; 275.)
53. Csernus, Sándor: Hungarológia: esély a belső és külső expanzióra HUNGAROLÓGIA 2:(3) pp. 138–150. (2000)
54. Csernus, Sándor: Franciaország In: Kristó Gyula, Makk Ferenc (szerk.): Európa és Magyarország Szent István korában. 403 p. Szeged: Csongrád megye Önkormányzata, 2000. pp. 101–123. (Dél-alföldi évszázadok; 12.)

1999
55. Clari, R. de, Csernus, Sándor (ford): Konstantinápoly egy keresztes lovag szemével In: Sz. Jónás I (szerk.): Középkori egyetemes történeti szöveggyűjtemény: Európa és a Közel-Kelet IV-XV. század. 579 p. Budapest: Osiris Kiadó, 1999. pp. 226–230
56. Clercq, Jacques du, Csernus, Sándor (ford): László magyar király követsége Franciaországban In: Sz. Jónás I (szerk.): Középkori egyetemes történeti szöveggyűjtemény: Európa és a Közel-Kelet IV-XV. század. 579 p. Budapest: Osiris Kiadó, 1999. pp. 568–570.
57. Commynes, Philippe de Egyéb szerzőség: Csernus, Sándor (ford.); Két uralkodói portré Commynes emlékirataiban: XI. Lajos és Mátyás In: Sz. Jónás I (szerk.): Középkori egyetemes történeti szöveggyűjtemény: Európa és a Közel-Kelet IV-XV. század. 579 p. Budapest: Osiris Kiadó, 1999. pp. 570–572.
58. Csernus, Sándor: A reneszánsz fejedelemtükrök forrásvidékén: Philippe de Commynes, a "francia Machiavelli" SZÁZADOK 133:(1) pp. 125–144. (1999)
59. Csernus, Sándor: A francia Machiavelli: Philippe de Commynes In: Kukovecz György (szerk.): A modern politikai gondolkodás kezdetei: Eszmék és folyamatok. Konferencia helye, ideje: Szeged, Magyarország, 1996.04.18 Szeged: JATEPress Kiadó, 1999. pp. 43–62. (Kék füzetek)
60. Csernus, Sándor: A középkori francia nyelvű történetírás és Magyarország: 13-15. század Budapest: Osiris Kiadó, 1999. 371 p. (Doktori mestermunkák)
61. Csernus, Sándor: Les Hongrie, les Français et les premières croisades In: Sándor Csernus, Klára Korompay (szerk.) Egyéb szerzőség: Mária Tandori, Katalin Csősz-Jutteau (bibliogr.); Les Hongrois et l'Europe: Conquête et intégration. 499 p. Konferencia helye, ideje: Paris, Franciaország, 1997.06.16-1997.06.17. Paris; Szeged: Institut Hongrois de Paris; JATE, 1999. pp. 411–426. (Publications de l'Institut hongrois de Paris)
62. Csernus, Sándor: A Párizsi Magyar Intézet : 70 év után végre Collegium Hungaricum?: A harmadik évezred magyar intézménye Párizsban HUNGAROLÓGIA 1:(1-2) pp. 24–33. (1999)
63. Csernus, Sándor: Szeged felszabadulása (1686): Részlet Lotharingiai Károly hadinaplójából In: Géczi L, Farkas Cs (szerk.) Helytörténeti szövegyűjtemény. Szeged: Csongrád Megyei Levéltár, 1999. p. 50.
64. Csernus, Sándor: A magyar Anjouk a korabeli francia nyelvű történetírásban In: Klaniczay G, Nagy Balázs (szerk.): A középkor szeretete: Történeti tanulmányok Sz. Jónás Ilona születésnapjára. 545 p. Budapest: ELTE Bölcsészettudományi Kar, 1999. pp. 425–436.
65. Juvénel des Ursins Jean, Csernus Sándor (ford): Zsigmond császár franciaországi látogatása In: Sz. Jónás I (szerk.): Középkori egyetemes történeti szöveggyűjtemény: Európa és a Közel-Kelet IV-XV. század. 579 p. Budapest: Osiris Kiadó, 1999. pp. 565–566.
66. Csernus, Sándor, Klára Korompay (szerk.) Egyéb szerzőség: Mária Tandori, Katalin Csősz-Jutteau (bibliogr.); Les Hongrois et l'Europe: Conquête et intégration Konferencia helye, ideje: Paris, Franciaország, 1997.06.16-1997.06.17. Paris; Szeged: Institut Hongrois de Paris; JATE, 1999. 499 p. (Publications de l'Institut hongrois de Paris)
67. Csernus, Sándor (szerk.): Publications de l’Institut Hongrois de Paris Series: Littérature, Documenta Hungarorum in Gallia, Dissertationes, Études, 1999-2007 (1999)

1998
68. Csernus, Sándor: A francia nyelvű történetírás kialakulása és főbb jellemzői ACTA HISTORICA (SZEGED) 106: pp. 3–29. (1998)
69. Csernus, Sándor: Zsigmond és a Hunyadiak a francia történetírásban SZÁZADOK 132:(1) pp. 47–127. (1998)
70. Csernus, Sándor: Les orientations principales de l’expansion de la France médiévale: Jérusalem, Rome, Troie In: Kukovecz György (szerk.): La Méditerranée et l'Europe : histoire et politique. 205 p. Konferencia helye, ideje: Szeged, Magyarország, 1996.10.11 Szeged: JATEPress Kiadó, 1998. pp. 195–197. (Kék füzetek; A Mediterrán tanulmányok különszáma)
71. Csernus, Sándor: Konstantinápoly bűvöletében: A IV. keresztes hadjárat és a francia történetírás kezdetei In: Makk Ferenc, Tar Ibolya, Wojtilla Gyula (szerk.): Studia varia: Tanulmányok Szádeczky-Kardoss Samu nyolcvanadik születésnapjára. 185 p. Szeged: József Attila Tudományegyetem (JATE), 1998. pp. 31–45.
72. Csernus, Sándor: Lancelot király és Magyarország mint a „Kereszténység védőbástyája” a 15. sz.-i francia történetírásban In: Jankovics József, Monok István, Nyerges Judit, Sárközy Péter (szerk.). A magyar művelődés és a kereszténység. La civiltá ungherese e il cristianesimo. I-III. kötet: A IV. Nemzetközi Hungarológiai Kongresszus előadásai [Atti del IV Congresso Internazionale di Studi Ungheresi]. 1891 p. Konferencia helye, ideje: Roma; Napoli, Olaszország, 1996.09.09-1996.09.14. Budapest; Szeged: Nemzetközi Magyar Filológiai Társaság; Scriptum, 1998. pp. 580–596.
73. Csernus, Sándor. La Toison d’Or et l’Europe, aspects politiques: L’Europe Centrale du XVe au XVIIIe siècles In: Richard J, Liez J-L (szerk.): La toison d'or : un mythe européen: Édité à l'occasion de l'Exposition La Toison d'Or, un Mythe Européen, 5 septembre - 13 décembre 1998, Château de Malbrouck à Manderen, Moselle. Metz; Paris: Serpenoise; Somogy, 1998. pp. 85–93
74. Csernus, Sándor: A dél-alföldi felsőoktatás a régió gazdaságáért: A "Dalphareg-program" záróértékelése In: Oktatás a gazdaság szolgálatában : "Az oktatás és a gazdaság kapcsolatainak erősítése" című Phare Program zárókonferenciája : 1998. június 12-13, Siófok [Education serving the needs of economy : "Strengthening the links between education and the economy" Phare Program HU-94.05 final conference]. 197 p. Konferencia helye, ideje: Siófok, Magyarország, 1998.06.12-1998.06.13. Budapest: MKM Phare PMU, p. &.1. kötet
75. Karáth, Tamás, Csernus, Sándor (szakmai lekt) (szerk.): Tervezet a kereszténység leendő békéjéről: Podjebrád-béketerv, 1464 pp. 1–31. Fordította és a bevezető tanulmányt írta Karáth Tamás. - Szeged : JATE Történész Diákkör, 1998. - 31 p. - (Documenta historica, 1216-0954 ; 39.). - A fordított dokumentum eredeti címe: Tractatus pacis toti Christianitati fiendae, 963-482-288-6 (1998)

1997
76. Csernus, Sándor: A középkori francia nyelvű történetírás és Magyarország: 13-15. sz. 25 p.
77. Emmanuel Le Roy Ladurie, Csernus, Sándor, Tóth Annamária, Szász Géza (szerk.): Montaillou, egy okszitán falu életrajza (1294-1324) Budapest: Osiris Kiadó, 1997. 607 p. (Osiris Könyvtár. Történelem)

1996
78. Csernus, Sándor: "Krisztusért és az ô ellenségei ellen.": A Maigret grófok adománylevele 1687-bôl AETAS: TÖRTÉNETTUDOMÁNYI FOLYÓIRAT 1996:(2-3) pp. 244–255. (1996)
79. Csernus, Sándor: A francia expanzió fő irányai : Jeruzsálem, Trója, Róma: Les orientations principales de l’expansion française au Moyen-âge: Jérusalem, Troie, Rome In: Kukovecz György (szerk.): A Mediterráneum az európai történelemben és a politikában: La Méditerranée et l'Europe: histoire et politique. Szeged: József Attila Tudományegyetem (JATE), 1996. pp. 19–21. (Kék Füzetek)

1995
80. Csernus, Sándor: Történelem és fikció: Magyarországi Károly úr regénye ACTA HISTORICA (SZEGED) 99: pp. 5–29. (1995)
81. Csernus, Sándor: Les Français dans les villes de la Hongrie médiévale In: Résumés; 120e Congrès National des Sociétés Historiques et Scientifiques: Aix-en-Provence, 23-29 octobre 1995. Konferencia helye, ideje: Aix-en-Provence, Franciaország, 1995.10.23-1995.10.29. Paris: Comité des travaux historiques et scientifiques (CTHS), pp. 110–111.
82. Csernus, Sándor: Francia források Zsigmond párizsi tartózkodásáról (1416 március) In: Koszta László (szerk.): Kelet és Nyugat között: Történeti tanulmányok Kristó Gyula tiszteletére. 521 p. Szeged: Szegedi Középkorász Műhely, 1995. pp. 103–140
83. Csernus, Sándor: "Pro Christo et contra inimicos eius.": Buda, 1686. CAHIERS D'ETUDES HONGROISES 7: pp. 68–77. (1995)
84. Csernus, Sándor: A francia IUT-rendszer tapasztalatai In: Dobay P (szerk.): Tanulmányok a post-secondary képzésekről: TEMPUS CME Projekt. Pécs; Budapest: Tempus Magyarországi Iroda, 1995. pp. 21–35.

1994
85. Bizzarro, A, Csernus, S (szakértő): Le Bleu dans les Étoiles CSM Productions, Paris -Luxembourg, 24 részes, Európa történetét költött epizódokban, de valós környezetben és részben valós történelmi személyiségek ábrázolásával bemutató rajzfilmsorozat (1994)
86. Csernus, Sándor: Voyage, récit de voyage et la Hongrie dans la littérature historique française des 14e et 15e siècles In: Tverdota György (szerk.): Écrire le voyage. 272 p. Paris: Presses de la Sorbonne Nouvelle, 1994. pp. 125–143.
87. Csernus, Sándor: Villehardouin, Geoffroy de In: Kristó Gyula, Engel Pál, Makk Ferenc (szerk.): Korai magyar történeti lexikon (9-14. század). 753 p. Budapest: Akadémiai Kiadó, 1994. p. 703. )
88. Csernus, Sándor: Clari, Robert de In: Kristó Gyula, Engel Pál, Makk Ferenc (szerk.): Korai magyar történeti lexikon (9-14. század). 753 p. Budapest: Akadémiai Kiadó, 1994. p. 140.
89. Csernus, Sándor: Joinville, Jean sire de In: Kristó Gyula, Engel Pál, Makk Ferenc (szerk.): Korai magyar történeti lexikon (9-14. század). 753 p. Budapest: Akadémiai Kiadó, 1994. p. 307.
90. Csernus, Sándor, et al: La Hongrie In: Frémy D, Frémy M (szerk.). Quid 1995. Paris: Editions Robert Laffont, 1994. pp. 1020–1023.
91. Csernus, Sándor: Les Hunyadi vus par les historiens français du 15e siècle In: Klaniczay T, Jankovics J (szerk.): Matthias Corvinus and the Humanism in Central Europe. 280 p. Budapest: Balassi Kiadó, 1994. pp. 75–95. (Studia humanitatis (ISSN 0324-7880); 10.)

1993
92. Csernus, Sándor: Réflexions sur l'édition d'un roman médiéval: Le Roman de Messire Charles de Hongrie; Texte en prose de la fin du 15ème siècle, édité par Marie-Luce Chenerie (Compte rendu) CAHIERS D'ETUDES HONGROISES 5: pp. 275–280. (1993)
93. Csernus, Sándor: A 15. századi francia útleírások Magyarország-képe In: Békési Imre, Jankovics József, Kósa László, Nyerges Judit (szerk.): Régi és új peregrináció : magyarok külföldön, külföldiek Magyarországon [3 kötet]: [III. Nemzetközi Hungarológiai Kongresszus]. 1823 p. Konferencia helye, ideje: Szeged, Magyarország, 1991.08.12-1991.08.16. Budapest; Szeged: Nemzetközi Magyar Filológiai Társaság; Scriptum, 1993. pp. 1006–1020.
94. Csernus, Sánor (szakértő): Ismeretlen barátaink: A Magyarországra menekült francia hadifoglyok történetéből; Dokumentumfilm

1991
95. Csernus, Sándor: Sigismond et la soustraction d’obédience: Une doctrine de politique internationale? In: Ministère de l'Éducation Nationale (szerk.): Crises et réformes dans l’église de la réforme grégorienne à la préréforme: Actes du 115e Congrès National des Sociétés Savantes (Avignon, 1990), Section d’histoire médiévale et de philologie. Konferencia helye, ideje: Avignon, Franciaország, 1990.04.09-1990.04.13. Paris: Comité des travaux historiques et scientifiques (CTHS), 1991. pp. 315–335.
96. Csernus, Sándor, Kövér, Lajos: Helytörténet és nemzeti történet Franciaországban: Ismertetés és beszámoló a Tudós Társaságok Országos Konferenciáinak rendszeréről VILÁGTÖRTÉNET 13:(2-3) pp. 74–78. (1991)

1990
97. Csernus, Sándor: Perspectives politiques et tentatives de regroupement territorial au début du quinzième siècle: Quelques aspects internationaux In: Congrès national des sociétés savantes (szerk.) Les pays de l'entre-deux au Moyen Âge : questions d'histoire des territoires d'Empire entre Meuse, Rhône et Rhin: Actes du 113e Congrès National des Sociétés Savantes (Strasbourg, 1988), Section d'histoire médiévale et de philologie. Konferencia helye, ideje: Strasbourg, Franciaország, 1988.04.05-1988.04.09. Paris: Comité des travaux historiques et scientifiques (CTHS), 1990. pp. 155–171.
98. Csernus, Sándor: Quelques aspects européens du conflit armagnac-bourguignon: Sigismond et la France des partis In: Ministère de l'Éducation Nationale de la Jeunesse et des Sports (szerk.): Violence et contestation au Moyen Age: Actes du 114e Congrès National des Sociétés Savantes (Paris, 1989), Section d'histoire médiévale et de philologie. Konferencia helye, ideje: Paris, Franciaország, 1989.04.03-1989.04.09. Paris: Comité des travaux historiques et scientifiques (CTHS), 1990. pp. 305–318

1989
99. Csernus, Sándor: A „Fehér Lovag”: A Hunyadi-mítosz kérdéséhez a 15. sz.-i francia történeti irodalomban In: Kulcsár Péter, Mader Béla, Monok István (szerk.): Tanulmányok Karácsonyi Béla hetvenedik születésnapjára. 157 p. Szeged: JATE Központi Könyvtára; JATE BTK Magyar Történeti Intézet, 1989. pp. 81–117.

1988
100. Csernus, Sándor: Mutation de l'historiographie francaise et elargissement de son horizon au XVe siecle: Un exemple: "les affaires de Hongrie" ACTA HISTORICA (SZEGED) 87: pp. 3–18. (1988)
101. Csernus, Sándor: "Lanselot, Roy de Honguerie et de Behaigne": Naissance et épanouissement d' un mythe au milieu du quinzieme siecle ACTA UNIVERSITATIS SZEGEDIENSIS DE ATTILA JOZSEF NOMINATAE ACTA ROMANICA 13: pp. 93–117. (1988)

1987
102. Fehérvári, Géza, Csernus, Sándor (szerk.): Az iszlám művészet története Budapest: Képzőművészeti Kiadó, 1987. 570 p.

1986
103. Bravard, J-P, Bethemont, J, Csernus, S (ford): Gabcikovo: Un grand projet et une controverse REVUE DE GÉOGRAPHIE DE LYON 61:(1) pp. 19–41. (1986)
104. Kornai, János, Richet, Xavier (szerk.) Egyéb szerzőség: Csernus, Anikó, Csernus, Sándor, Xavier, Richet, Madeleine Tchimichkian (ford.); La Voie hongroise: Analyses et expérimentations économiques Paris: Calmann-Lévy, 1986. 319 p. (Perspectives de l'économique. Économie contemporaine)

1983
105. Csernus, Sándor: A nemzetközi kapcsolatok rendszerének átalakulása Nyugat-Európában a 15. század elején ACTA HISTORICA (SZEGED) 76: pp. 11–23. (1983)

1978
106. Csernus, Sándor: A zsigmondi magyar állam külpolitikája 1420-ig, különös tekintettel Nyugat-Európára 180 p., doktori disszertáció.

1975
107. Csernus, Sándor: Zsigmond nyugat-európai diplomáciai tevékenysége a konstanzi zsinat időszakában: (1414–1418) ACTA IUVENUM SECTIO HISTORICA 7: pp. 29–64. (1975)

References

Bibliogryphy

External links
 

Bibliographies by writer
Bibliographies of Hungarian writers
Science bibliographies